Edwin Page "Ted" Kennedy (7 September 1877 – 23 July 1948) was an Australian rules footballer who played for Essendon and Carlton in the Victorian Football League (VFL) during the early 1900s. He was the brother of footballer and politician James Kennedy.

A wingman, Kennedy made his VFL debut with Essendon in their premiership year of 1901 but missed out on playing in the Grand Final due to injury. He did however play in the decider the following season but ended up on the losing team. In 1904 he crossed to Carlton and became a three time premiership player with the club, forming a strong centre combination with George Bruce and Rod McGregor.

References

External links

Blueseum profile
Essendon Football Club profile

1877 births
1948 deaths
Australian rules footballers from Melbourne
Australian Rules footballers: place kick exponents
Essendon Football Club players
Carlton Football Club players
Carlton Football Club Premiership players
Three-time VFL/AFL Premiership players
People from Parkville, Victoria
Australian people of English descent
Australian people of Scottish descent